Dysoptus pentalobus is a species of moth in the family Arrhenophanidae. It is known only from the type locality in the Atlantic coastal forests of south-eastern Brazil.

The length of the forewings is about 4.8 mm for males. Adults are on wing in late January (based on one record). It was first described by Donald R. Davis in 2003.

Etymology
The specific name is derived from the Greek pente (five) and lobos (a rounded projection), in reference to the complex, five-lobed, saccular apex of the valva.

References

External links
Family Arrhenophanidae

Dysoptus
Taxa named by Donald R. Davis (entomologist)
Moths described in 2003